David Glenn Baker (born November 25, 1956) is an American former professional baseball third baseman. Baker appeared in nine games with the Toronto Blue Jays of Major League Baseball (MLB) in 1982. He is an alumnus of UCLA.

Baker is the older brother of Doug Baker who also played in the major leagues.

References

External links

1956 births
Living people
American expatriate baseball players in Canada
Baseball players from Iowa
Dunedin Blue Jays players
Knoxville Blue Jays players
Major League Baseball third basemen
People from Warren County, Iowa
Syracuse Chiefs players
Toronto Blue Jays players
Toledo Mud Hens players
UCLA Bruins baseball players
Anchorage Glacier Pilots players
Alaska Goldpanners of Fairbanks players